Albertów may refer to the following places:
Albertów, Pabianice County in Łódź Voivodeship (central Poland)
Albertów, Gmina Lubochnia in Łódź Voivodeship (central Poland)
Albertów, Gmina Rokiciny in Łódź Voivodeship (central Poland)
Albertów, Lublin Voivodeship (east Poland)
Albertów, Greater Poland Voivodeship (west-central Poland)
Albertów, Silesian Voivodeship (south Poland)